In computing, control-\ is a control character in ASCII code, also known as the file separator (FS) character. It is generated by pressing the  key while holding down the  key on a computer keyboard.

Under most UNIX-based operating systems control-\ is used to terminate a running process from a command shell and have it produce a memory core dump by sending it a SIGQUIT signal.

In the Emacs text editor, it is the default keystroke mapping for autocompletion.

See also
Control-C
Control-Z
kill (command)
Unix signal

Computer keys